Chandrabati Devi (19 October 190929 April 1992) was an Indian actress who appeared in Hindi as well as Bengali cinema. She is best known for her role as Chandramukhi in the 1935 cult classic Devdas.

Chandrabati Devi made her film debut in a 1929 silent film Piyari and was catapulted to stardom after she portrayed the role of Meera in Debaki Bose's cult classic Meerabai (1933).

Filmography

 Ami Ratan (1979)
 Praner Thakur Ramkrishna (1977) as Bhairabi Maa
 Rodanbhara Basanta (1974)
 Kayahiner Kahini (1973)
 Agnibhramar (1973)
 Ami Sirajer Begam (1973)
 Bigyan O Bidhata (1973)
 Chhinnapatra (1972)
 Naya Michhil (1972)
 Jiban Jigyasa (1971)
 Atattar Din Pare (1971)
 Fariyad (1971)
 Rajkanya (1965)
 Kantatar (1964)
 Sakher Chor (1960)
 Raja Saja (1960)
 Indradhanu (1960)
 Bicharak (1959)
 Marutirtha Hinglaj (1959) as Jogini Maa
 Deep Jwele Jai (1959)
 E Jahar Se Jahar Noy (1959)
 Raater Andhakare (1959)
 Sashibabur Sansar (1959)
 Indrani (1958)
 Parash Pathar (1958) as herself(guest appearance)
 Lilakanka (1958)
 Marmabani (1958)
 Jiban Trishna (1957)
 Pathe Holo Deri (1957)
 Chandranath (1957)
 Harano Sur (1957)
 Taser Ghar (1957)
 Prithibi Amare Chay (1957)
 Abhishek (1957)
 Madhabir Janya (1957)
 Panchatapa (1957)
 Srimatir Sansar (1957)
 Tamasa (1957)
 Tapasi (1957)
 Putrabadhu (1956)
 Trijama (1956)
 Ekti Raat (1956)
 Laksha Heera (1956)
Dui Purush (1945) 
Priyo Bandhobi (1943) 
Protishruti (1941)- as Sumitra,a society woman
Shuktara (1940) 
Devdas (1935) -as Chandramukhi
Meerabai (1933)-as Meera

References

External links
 

1909 births
1992 deaths
Actresses from Kolkata
Indian Hindus
Actresses from Bihar
Bengali actresses
Indian film actresses
Bengali Hindus
Actresses in Bengali cinema
20th-century Indian actresses